Asad Aba (also Romanized as Āsad Ābā; also known as Asadābād) is a village in Lasgerd Rural District, in the Central District of Sorkheh County, Semnan Province, Iran. At the 2006 census, its population was 93, in 25 families.

References 

Populated places in Sorkheh County